Runo may refer to:

 Runo (legendary king), from The History of the Kings of Britain
 Ruño, an ethnic group of Peru
 Runö, an island in Estonia
Cantos of the Kalevala

People with the name 
 Gösta Runö, Swedish athlete
 Runo Isaksen, Norwegian writer
 Steven Runo, Kenyan scientist

See also 
 Runnö, an island in the Oskarshamn archipelago of Sweden
 Runology
 A form of traditional Finnish poetry